The 1939 Home Nations Championship was the thirty-fifth series of the rugby union Home Nations Championship. Including the previous incarnations as the Five Nations, and prior to that, the Home Nations, this was the fifty-second series of the northern hemisphere rugby union championship. Six matches were played between 21 January and 18 March. It was contested by England, Ireland, Scotland and Wales.

This was the last tournament that did not feature France, which had been expelled after the 1931 tournament over allegations of professionalism and administrative deficiencies. France would be readmitted later in the year, but the start of World War II in Europe in September put international rugby on hold; it would not resume until 1947. The Calcutta Cup match was the last international game before World War II. Six players who took part in the game would lose their lives during the war, while seven would return to international rugby post-war.

Participants
The teams involved were:

Table

Results

References

External links

1939
Home Nations
Home Nations
Home Nations
Home Nations
Home Nations
Home Nations Championship
Home Nations Championship
Home Nations Championship